Charles Ambrose Bickford (January 1, 1891 – November 9, 1967) was an American actor known for supporting roles. He was nominated three times for the Academy Award for Best Supporting Actor, for The Song of Bernadette (1943), The Farmer's Daughter (1947), and Johnny Belinda (1948). His other roles include Whirlpool (1950), A Star Is Born (1954), and The Big Country (1958).

Early life
Bickford was born in Cambridge, Massachusetts, during the first minute of 1891. His parents were Loretus and Mary Ellen Bickford. The fifth of seven children, he was an intelligent but very independent and unruly child. He had a particularly strong relationship with his maternal grandfather, a sea captain, who was a powerful influence during his formative years. At the age of nine, he was tried and acquitted of the attempted murder of a trolley motorman, who had callously driven over and killed his beloved dog. He attended Foster School and Everett High School.

Always more interested in experiencing life than reading about it, Bickford was considered "the wild rogue" of this family, causing his parents frequent consternation.  In his late teens, he drifted aimlessly around the United States for a time. Before breaking into acting, he worked as a lumberjack and investment promoter, and for a short time, ran a pest-extermination business. He was a stoker and fireman in the United States Navy when a friend dared him to get a job in burlesque. Bickford served as an engineer lieutenant in the United States Army during World War I. His first entry into acting was on the stage, eventually including Broadway. This venue provided him with an occasional living and served as the principal training ground for developing his acting and vocal talents.

Acting career
Bickford had intended to attend the Massachusetts Institute of Technology (MIT) to earn an engineering degree, but while wandering around the country, he became friends with the manager of a burlesque show, who convinced Bickford to take a role in the show. He debuted in Oakland, California in 1911.  Bickford enjoyed himself so much that he abandoned his plans to attend MIT.  He made his legitimate stage debut with the John Craig Stock Company at the Castle Square Theatre in Boston in 1912. He eventually joined a road company and traveled throughout the United States for more than a decade, appearing in various productions.  In 1925, while working in a Broadway play called Outside Looking In,  co-star James Cagney (in his first Broadway role) and he received rave reviews. He was offered a role in Herbert Brenon's 1926 film of Beau Geste, but anxious not to give up his newfound Broadway stardom, refused it, a decision he later came to regret.  Following his appearance in the critically praised but unsuccessful Maxwell Anderson-Harold Hickerson drama about the Sacco and Vanzetti case Gods of the Lightning (Bickford was the Sacco character), he was contacted by filmmaker Cecil B. DeMille and offered a contract with Metro-Goldwyn-Mayer (MGM) studios to star in DeMille's first talking picture: Dynamite. He soon began working with MGM studio chief Louis B. Mayer on a number of projects.

Bickford became a star after playing Greta Garbo's lover in Anna Christie (1930), but never developed into a leading man. Always independent minded, exceptionally strong-willed, and quick with his fists, Bickford frequently argued and nearly came to blows with Mayer and any number of other MGM authority figures during the course of this contract with the studio. During the production of Dynamite, he punched out his director following a string of heated arguments, primarily related to the interpretation of his character's role. Throughout his early career on both the stage and later films, Bickford rejected numerous scripts and made no secret of his disdain for much of the material he was offered.  Not surprisingly, his association with MGM was short-lived, with Bickford asking for and quickly receiving a release from his contract.  He soon found himself blacklisted at other studios, though, forcing him  to take the highly unusual step (for that era) of becoming an independent actor for several years.  His career took another turn in 1935, when  he was mauled by a lion and nearly killed while filming East of Java. While he recovered, he lost his contract with Twentieth Century-Fox and his leading-man status owing to extensive neck scarring suffered in the attack, coupled with his advancing age. Soon, he made a very successful transition to character roles, which he felt offered much greater diversity and allowed him to showcase his talent to better effect.  Much preferring the character roles that became his forte, Bickford appeared in many notable films, including The Farmer's Daughter, Johnny Belinda, A Star Is Born, and Not as a Stranger.
    
Finding great success playing an array of character roles in films and later in television, Bickford quickly became highly sought-after; his burly frame and craggy, intense features, coupled with a gruff, powerful voice lent themselves to a wide variety of roles. Most often, he played lovable father figures, stern businessmen, heavies, ship captains, or authority figures of some sort. During the 1940s, he was nominated three times for the Academy Award for Best Supporting Actor. He served as host of the 1950s television series The Man Behind the Badge.

On April 16, 1958, Bickford appeared with Roger Smith in "The Daniel Barrister Story" on Wagon Train. In this first-season episode, Daniel Barrister, played by Bickford, objects to medical treatment for his wife, Jenny, the victim of a wagon accident. Meanwhile, Dr. Peter H. Culver, played by Smith, has successfully fought a smallpox epidemic in a nearby town. He is taken to the wagon train by scout Flint McCullough, portrayed by series regular Robert Horton, to treat Mrs. Barrister. Viewers never knew if Barrister yielded to allow Dr. Culver to treat Jenny.

Bickford continued to act in generally prestigious projects right up to his death. He guest-starred on The Islanders, The Barbara Stanwyck Show, and The Eleventh Hour. In his final years, Bickford played rancher John Grainger, owner of the Shiloh Ranch, on The Virginian. Bickford was well-liked by both fans and his fellow actors, including series lead James Drury. According to Drury, Bickford, who guest-starred earlier in the series in an unrelated role, wished he could have been on the series from the beginning. According to Paul Green, author of A History of Television's The Virginian, 1962-1971,  Bickford's vigorous portrayal of John Grainger helped restore the quality of the show after what some considered a chaotic fourth season.

Two of the actor's most memorable late-career, big-screen roles came in the Western The Big Country (1958), as a wealthy and ruthless rancher, with Gregory Peck and Charlton Heston; and in the drama Days of Wine and Roses (1962), as the forlorn father of an alcoholic, with Jack Lemmon and Lee Remick. President Dwight D. Eisenhower, who resembled Bickford, ran The Big Country four nights in a row in the White House when it was first released.

Personal life
Bickford married Beatrice Ursula Allen in 1916, in Manhattan. The couple had a son, Rex, and a daughter, Doris. Some sources have stated that Rex died in 1960, but this is disputed by a newspaper story printed at the time of his father's death, which stated he was aged 42 and married.

Bickford was a practicing Catholic and a Democrat who supported Adlai Stevenson's campaign during the 1952 presidential election.

In 1965, Bickford published his autobiography Bulls, Balls, Bicycles, & Actors.

Death and legacy
Bickford died in Los Angeles on November 9, 1967, at age 76, of pneumonia and a blood infection after being hospitalized for an extended period.

Bickford received two stars on the Hollywood Walk of Fame in 1960. His motion-picture star is located at 6780 Hollywood Boulevard, and his television star is located at 1620 Vine Street.

Filmography

As actor

 South Sea Rose (1929) - Capt. Briggs
 Dynamite (1929) - Hagon Derk
 Hell's Heroes (1929) - Bob Sangster
 Anna Christie (1930) - Matt Burke
 The Sea Bat (1930) - John Dennis aka Reverend Sims
 River's End (1930) - John Keith / Sgt. Conniston
 Passion Flower (1930) - Dan Wallace
 East of Borneo (1931) - Dr. Allan Randolph
 The Squaw Man (1931) - Cash Hawkins
 The Pagan Lady (1931) - Dingo Mike
 Men in Her Life (1931) - 'Flashy' Madden
 Panama Flo (1932) - Dan McTeague
 Scandal for Sale (1932) - Jerry Strong
 Thunder Below (1932) - Walt
 The Last Man (1932) - Bannister
 Vanity Street (1932) - rian Murphy
 No Other Woman (1933) - Jim Stanley
 Song of the Eagle (1933) - Joe (Nails) Anderson
 This Day and Age (1933) - Louis Garrett
 White Woman (1933) - Ballister
 Red Wagon (1933) - Joe Prince
 Little Miss Marker (1934) - Big Steve Halloway
 A Wicked Woman (1934) - Naylor
 A Notorious Gentleman (1935) - Kirk Arlen
 Under Pressure (1935) - Nipper Moran
 The Farmer Takes a Wife (1935) - Jotham Klore
 East of Java (1935) - Red McGovern aka Harvey Bowers
 Rose of the Rancho (1936) - Joe Kincaid
 Pride of the Marines (1936) - Steve Riley
 The Plainsman (1936) - John Lattimer
 High, Wide, and Handsome (1937) - Red Scanlon
 Thunder Trail (1937) - Lee Tate
 Night Club Scandal (1937) - Det. Capt. McKinley
 Daughter of Shanghai (1937) - Otto Hartman
 Gangs of New York (1938) - 'Rocky' Thorpe / John Franklyn
 Valley of the Giants (1938) - Howard Fallon
 The Storm (1938) - Bob 'Sparks' Roberts
 Stand Up and Fight (1939) - Arnold
 Romance of the Redwoods (1939) - Steve Blake
 Street of Missing Men (1939) - Cash Darwin
 Our Leading Citizen (1939) - Shep Muir
 Mutiny in the Big House (1939) - Father Joe Collins
 One Hour to Live (1939) - Insp. Sid Brady
 Of Mice and Men (1939) - Slim
 Thou Shalt Not Kill (1939) - Rev. Chris Saunders
 Girl from God's Country (1940) - Bill Bogler
 South to Karanga (1940) - Jeff Worthing
 Queen of the Yukon (1940) - Ace Rincon
 Riders of Death Valley (1941, Serial) - Wolf Reade
 Burma Convoy (1941) - Cliff Weldon
 Reap the Wild Wind (1942) - Master of the 'Tyfib'
 Tarzan's New York Adventure (1942) - Buck Rand
 Mr. Lucky (1943) - Hard Swede
 The Song of Bernadette (1943) - Father Peyramale
 Wing and a Prayer (1944) - Capt. Waddell
 Captain Eddie (1945) - William Rickenbacker
 Fallen Angel (1945) - Mark Judd
 Duel in the Sun (1946) - Sam Pierce
 The Farmer's Daughter (1947) - Clancy
 The Woman on the Beach (1947) - Tod
 Brute Force (1947) - Gallagher
 The Babe Ruth Story (1948) - Brother Matthias
 Four Faces West (1948) - Pat Garrett
 Johnny Belinda (1948) - Black MacDonald
 Command Decision (1948) - Elmer Brockhurst
 Roseanna McCoy (1949) - Devil Anse Hatfield
 Whirlpool (1950) - Lt. James Colton
 Guilty of Treason (1950) - Joszef Cardinal Mindszenty
 Riding High (1950) - J.L. Higgins
 Branded (1950) - Mr. Lavery
 Jim Thorpe – All-American (1951) - Glenn S. 'Pop' Warner
 The Raging Tide (1951) - Hamil Linder
 Elopement (1951) - Tom Reagan
 The Last Posse (1953) - Sampson Drune
 A Star Is Born (1954) - Oliver Niles
 Prince of Players (1955) - Dave Prescott
 Not as a Stranger (1955) - Dr. Dave Runkleman
 The Court-Martial of Billy Mitchell (1955) - Gen. Jimmy Guthrie
 You Can't Run Away from It (1956) - A.A. Andrews
 Mister Cory (1957) - Jeremiah Des Plains 'Biloxi' Caldwell
 The Big Country (1958) - Maj. Henry Terrill
 Woman on the Run (1959, TV movie)
 Winterset (1959, TV movie) - Judge Gaunt
 The 33rd (1959, TV movie)
 The Unforgiven (1960) - Zeb Rawlins
 The Gambler, the Nun and the Radio (1960, TV movie)
 The Farmer's Daughter (1962, TV movie) - Clancy
 Days of Wine and Roses (1962) - Ellis Arnesen
 Della (1964) - Hugh Stafford
 A Big Hand for the Little Lady (1966) - Benson Tropp
 The Virginian (1966-1967) - Grainger

As himself
 Screen Snapshots Series 9, No. 20 (1930, short)
 Screen Snapshots (1932, documentary short)
 Hollywood on Parade No. B-6 (1934, short)
 The Dark Wave (1956, documentary short)
 Now Is Tomorrow (1958, TV movie)

See also

List of actors with Academy Award nominations

References

Further reading

External links

 
 
 
 
 Charles Bickford at Virtual History

1891 births
1967 deaths
Male actors from Cambridge, Massachusetts
Writers from Cambridge, Massachusetts
Military personnel from Massachusetts
American male film actors
American male stage actors
American male television actors
People from Greater Los Angeles
Male Western (genre) film actors
Metro-Goldwyn-Mayer contract players
Burials at Woodlawn Memorial Cemetery, Santa Monica
20th Century Studios contract players
20th-century American male actors
American Roman Catholics
California Democrats
Massachusetts Democrats
Deaths from pneumonia in California